Chathurartha Devadithya Gardiyawasam Lindamulage Roy Aloysius Felix de Silva, popularly known as Roy de Silva (රෝයි ද සිල්වා; 30 August 1937 – 30 June 2018), was a Sri Lankan actor and film director in Sri Lankan cinema and former acting president of the Olympic Council of Asia. He entered the film industry as an actor in 1964 with Sujage Rahasa directed by Palaniyaandi Neelakantan. He then moved towards cinema direction, becoming one of the most successful film makers in the Sri Lankan film industry. His blockbuster movies such as Re Daniel Dawal Migel series, Cheriyo series, Clean Out, and Sir Last Chance were economically successful and made hallmarks in the industry.

Personal life
Born on 30 August 1937, as Chathurartha Devadithya Gardiyawasam Lindamulage Roy Aloysius Felix de Silva, he quickly changed his name to Roy de Silva in the beginning of his cinema career. He was born in Yatawatta, Matale as the fourth of seven siblings.

He first attended Yatawatta Sinhala School, and then moved to St. Sebastian's College, Moratuwa and completed advanced level from St. Joseph's College, Colombo. Just after completing school, he started to act in many stage dramas such as Narbona Hee Ranaweera Sebala and Surath Liliya.

He was married to fellow Sri Lankan actress Sumana Amarasinghe and they have two children. Roy died on 30 June 2018 at the age of 80. Sumana Amarasinghe died on 5 June 2022 at the age of 74 while receiving treatment at the Sri Jayewardenepura Hospital due to a sudden illness.

Career as an actor
De Silva came to the silver screen through Sujage Rahasa directed by P. Neelakantan, a famous South Indian director who accompanied MGR as well. The film was released on 24 December 1964 and received a positive reception from critics. His success was achieved through stylish acting, Tamil Indian actor like personality and fluency in Tamil. This in turn gave him many opportunities to act under many Tamil directors in his early days.

In 1972, de Silva's film Sujeewa surpassed the gross earnings of Edath Suraya Adath Suraya, starring the most famous Sri Lankan actor of that time, Gamini Fonseka.

De Silva's acting career mostly came under directors like Joe Dev Anand, Danny Mariyadasan, M S Anandan, K Venkat, Kingsley Rajapakse, Robin Tampoe, Lenin Morayes, and Cyril P. Abeyratne.

De Silva had the ability to remember long dialogues.

As a singer
Apart from direction and acting, De Silva also performed as a playback singer on a few occasions, such as in the films Tom Pachaya and Minisun Athara Minisek.

Death and legacy
On 30 June 2018, De Silva died while being treated for a heart attack at Sri Jayawardenepura General Hospital. His remains were buried on 2 July 2018 at Kanatte Cemetery.

On 1 September 2018, de Silva's autobiography was launched at Tharangani Hall. The book is titled Ada Siyawasaka Sadadara Roy.

On 5 July 2020, de Silva's wife Sumana Amarasinghe organized an alms giving at an old house in Colombo in two year commemoration of his death.

Filmography
 No. denotes the number of Sri Lankan films in the Sri Lankan cinema.

As a director
De Silva was primarily a director of comedy films, which made him one of Sri Lanka's promising directors in Sri Lanka cinema industry. His first direction was of the 1977 film Tom Pachaya, co-directed with Stanley Perera. Up to 2016, he directed 33 films, with more than 70 percent of the films easily passing 100 days and becoming blockbuster hits. De Silva's first English film direction was It's a Matter of Time in 1991.

References

External links
Aladin brings on screen a wonderful lamp
රෝයි-සුමනා මතකරූ ඡායා
සුමනා අමරසිංහ මරණාසන්න මොහොතේ අත්දැකීම් විස්තර කරයි
ප්‍රවීන සිනමාකරු රෝයි ද සිල්වා අභාවප්‍රාප්ත වෙයි
Veteran actor Roy de Silva passes away at age 80

1937 births
2018 deaths
Sri Lankan male film actors
Sri Lankan film directors
Sinhalese male actors
People from Matale District